The December 2008 Final Resolution was a professional wrestling pay-per-view (PPV) event produced by Total Nonstop Action Wrestling (TNA), which took place on December 7, 2008 at the TNA Impact! Zone in Orlando, Florida. It was the fifth event under the Final Resolution chronology and second Final Resolution event to take place in 2008. Final Resolution was usually held in January; in early October 2008 TNA moved the event to December. As a result of TNA's decision, two Final Resolution events took place in 2008; the other was in January.

In October 2017, with the launch of the Global Wrestling Network, the event became available to stream on demand. It would later be available on Impact Plus in May 2019.

Storylines

Final Resolution featured seven professional wrestling matches that involved different wrestlers from pre-existing scripted feuds and storylines. Wrestlers portrayed villains, heroes, or less distinguishable characters in the scripted events that built tension and culminated in a wrestling match or series of matches.

Results

References

External links
Final Resolution at In Demand.com
TNA Wrestling.com

Final Resolution (2008.2)
2008 in professional wrestling in Florida
Professional wrestling shows in Orlando, Florida
December 2008 events in the United States
2008 Total Nonstop Action Wrestling pay-per-view events